is a Japanese yuri manga series written and illustrated by Miyabi Fujieda. It moved to the magazine's successor Comic Yuri Hime in 2005 where it continued and concluded under its new title.

Plot
A witch named Reti, an architecture enthusiast, happens upon a hidden shrine surrounded by a barrier, and when she undoes the barrier she meets a sheltered miko named Tsumugi.  Tsumugi has never left the shrine, and she then decides she wants to travel with Reti.  Over the course of the series the two of them fall in love.

Characters
 Gretia "Reti" Dietrich 
 
 A witch who is an enthusiast for ancient architecture.

 

 A miko.  She was sealed in her family's temple shrine for her own protection, as the outside world was poisonous to her pure spirit.

 
 
 A lady supervisor of Tsumugi.

 
 
 God of the Tokigami mountain shrine.  She transfers some of her power to Reti so that Tsumugi can live in the outside world.

Media

Manga
Kotonoha no Miko to Kotodama no Majo to is a manga series written and illustrated by Miyabi Fujieda, which first began serialization in Yuri Shimai as Torikago no Miko to Kimagure na Majo to in the fourth volume sold on July 27, 2004. It moved to the magazines' successor Comic Yuri Hime and the title was changed to Kotonoha no Miko to Kotodama no Majo to. The bound volume  was released on July 14, 2006.

Drama CDs
The limited edition version of the manga was accompanied with a drama CD entitled 
Kotonoha no Miko to Kotodama no Majo to Drama CD "Madrigal Halloween" drama CD was published October 31, 2006
In both drama CDs, characters from Miyabi's other work Ameiro Kochakan Kandan are also featured in a fictional crossover.

References

External links

2004 manga
Ichijinsha manga
Yuri (genre) anime and manga